J. Brian Peckham (1934-2008) was a professor of Near and Middle Eastern Civilizations at Regis College in the Toronto School of Theology and the Centre for the Study of Religion at the University of Toronto. In 1993, Peckham published "History and Prophecy: The Development of Late Judean Literary Traditions," which argues that the Bible was created from the beginning as a work of literature, and that biblical text was meant to be read and performed.

References

Harvard University alumni
Old Testament scholars
1934 births
2008 deaths